Nectopsyche is a genus of white millers in the family Leptoceridae. There are at least 60 described species in Nectopsyche.

Species
These 60 species belong to the genus Nectopsyche:

 Nectopsyche acutiloba Flint, 1974
 Nectopsyche adusta Flint, 1983
 Nectopsyche albida (Walker, 1852)
 Nectopsyche argentata Flint, 1991
 Nectopsyche aureofasciata Flint, 1981
 Nectopsyche aureovittata Flint, 1983
 Nectopsyche bellus (Mueller, 1921)
 Nectopsyche brethesi (Navas, 1920)
 Nectopsyche bruchi (Navas, 1920)
 Nectopsyche brunneofascia Flint, 1983
 Nectopsyche cana (Navas, 1924)
 Nectopsyche candida (Hagen, 1861)
 Nectopsyche cubana (Banks, 1938)
 Nectopsyche diarina (Ross, 1944)
 Nectopsyche diminuta (Banks, 1920)
 Nectopsyche dorsalis (Banks, 1901)
 Nectopsyche exophalma Holzenthal
 Nectopsyche exophthalma Holzenthal, 1995
 Nectopsyche exquisita (Walker, 1852)
 Nectopsyche flavofasciata (Ulmer, 1907)
 Nectopsyche fulva (Navás, 1930)
 Nectopsyche fuscomaculata Flint, 1983
 Nectopsyche gemma (Mueller, 1880)
 Nectopsyche gemmoides Flint, 1981
 Nectopsyche globigona Botosaneanu, 1998
 Nectopsyche gracilis (Banks, 1901)
 Nectopsyche jenseni (Ulmer, 1905)
 Nectopsyche lahontanensis Haddock, 1977
 Nectopsyche lewisi (Flint, 1968)
 Nectopsyche lucipeta (Navas, 1923)
 Nectopsyche maculipennis Flint, 1983
 Nectopsyche minuta (Banks, 1900)
 Nectopsyche modesta (Mueller, 1921)
 Nectopsyche monticola Holzenthal, 1995
 Nectopsyche mouticola Holzenthal
 Nectopsyche muelleri (Ulmer, 1905)
 Nectopsyche muhni (Navas, 1916)
 Nectopsyche multilineata Flint, 1983
 Nectopsyche navasi Holzenthal in Flint, Holzenthal & Harris, 2000
 Nectopsyche nigricapilla (Navas, 1920)
 Nectopsyche nordmani (Klingstedt, 1943)
 Nectopsyche onyx Holzenthal, 1995
 Nectopsyche ortizi Holzenthal, 1995
 Nectopsyche padrenavasi Holzenthal in Flint, Holzenthal & Harris, 2000
 Nectopsyche paludicola Harris, 1986
 Nectopsyche pantosticta Flint, 1983
 Nectopsyche pavida (Hagen, 1861)
 Nectopsyche punctata (Ulmer, 1905)
 Nectopsyche quatuorguttata (Navas, 1922)
 Nectopsyche separata (Banks, 1920)
 Nectopsyche spiloma (Ross, 1944)
 Nectopsyche splendida (Navas, 1917)
 Nectopsyche stigmatica (Banks, 1914)
 Nectopsyche taleola Flint, 1974
 Nectopsyche tapanti Holzenthal, 1995
 Nectopsyche tavara (Ross, 1944)
 Nectopsyche texana (Banks, 1905)
 Nectopsyche thallina (Navas, 1922)
 Nectopsyche tuanis Holzenthal, 1995
 Nectopsyche utleyorum Holzenthal, 1995

References

Further reading

External links

 

Trichoptera genera
Articles created by Qbugbot
Integripalpia